Mikhail Stepanovich Svechnikov (30 September 1882 – 26 August 1938) was a Russian military officer in the Imperial Russian Army and the Red Army. He is best known as one of the military leaders of the Red Guards in the 1918 Finnish Civil War.

Career 
After his service in the Imperial Russian Army, Svechnikov took part at the 1917 October Revolution. During the 1918 Finnish Civil War he worked as a military advisor for the Red Guards. In February 1918, Svechnikov was shortly the Commander-in-Chief of the Northern Front, replaced then by Hugo Salmela. He was the highest ranked Russian officer who joined the Finnish Red Guards.

As the Finnish Civil War was over, Svechnikov fought in the Russian Civil War, in which he led the Caspian-Caucasian Front in the unsuccessful Northern Caucasus Operation (1918–1919).

Since 1922 he worked as a military lecturer. In 1934 Svechnikov was transferred to the Frunze Military Academy. He was arrested in 1937, accused on "Fascist conspiracy", and later executed at the Kommunarka shooting ground in Moscow. Svechnikov was rehabilitated after Stalin's death in 1956.

References 

1882 births
1938 deaths
People from Serafimovichsky District
People from Don Host Oblast
Imperial Russian Army personnel
Russian military personnel of the Boxer Rebellion
Russian military personnel of the Russo-Japanese War
Russian military personnel of World War I
Russian revolutionaries
People of the Finnish Civil War (Red side)
People of the Russian Civil War
People executed for treason against the Soviet Union
Great Purge victims from Russia
Soviet kombrigs